Yasny is a rural locality (a khutor) in Belyayevsky Selsoviet Rural Settlement, Konyshyovsky District, Kursk Oblast, Russia. Population:

Geography 
The khutor is located on the Svapa River (right tributary of the Seym River), 39 km from the Russia–Ukraine border, 86 km north-west of Kursk, 22 km north-west of the district center – the urban-type settlement Konyshyovka, 10 km from the selsoviet center – Belyayevo.

 Climate
Yasny has a warm-summer humid continental climate (Dfb in the Köppen climate classification).

Transport 
Yasny is located 33 km from the federal route  Ukraine Highway, 62 km from the route  Crimea Highway, 22 km from the route  (Trosna – M3 highway), 23 km from the road of regional importance  (Fatezh – Dmitriyev), 24 km from the road  (Konyshyovka – Zhigayevo – 38K-038), 5.5 km from the road  (Dmitriyev – Beryoza – Menshikovo – Khomutovka), 20.5 km from the road  (Lgov – Konyshyovka), 9 km from the road of intermunicipal significance  (Konyshyovka – Makaro-Petrovskoye, with the access road to the villages of Belyayevo and Chernicheno), 1.5 km from the road  (38N-144 – Nischneje Pessotschnoje), 16.5 km from the nearest railway halt 536 km (railway line Navlya – Lgov-Kiyevsky).

The rural locality is situated 92 km from Kursk Vostochny Airport, 177 km from Belgorod International Airport and 293 km from Voronezh Peter the Great Airport.

References

Notes

Sources

Rural localities in Konyshyovsky District